San Clemente (Spanish for "St. Clement") is a city in Orange County, California. Located in the Orange Coast region of the South Coast of California, San Clemente's population was 64,293 in at the 2020 census. Situated roughly midway between Los Angeles and San Diego, San Clemente is a popular tourist destination in Southern California, known for its beaches, Spanish Colonial Revival architecture, and hospitality industry. San Clemente's city slogan is "Spanish Village by the Sea".

History

Indigenous 
The Acjachemen are the Indigenous people of San Clemente. Panhe was located about three miles south of San Clemente, and has been historically documented to be over 9,600 years old. It remains an important site for the Acjachemen.

Spanish era

In 1776 Father Junípero Serra founded Mission San Juan Capistrano, and afterward the local indigenous people were dubbed "Juaneños" in Spanish. Both Native Americans and Spanish settlers established villages near the mission, and local indigenous people were conscripted to work for the mission.

Mexican and Post-Conquest eras
San Clemente was included as part of Rancho Boca de la Playa, granted in 1846 by Governor Pío Pico to Emigdio Véjar. Following the American conquest of California, California came under United States sovereignty in 1848. In 1860, Véjar sold the rancho to Juan Ávila, grantee of Rancho Niguel, who later conveyed it to his son-in-law, Pablo Pryor.

American era
Property rights to the land exchanged hands several times, but few ventured to build on it until 1925, when former Mayor of Seattle, Ole Hanson, an out-of-town major land developer, purchased and designed a  community with the financial help of a syndicate headed by Hamilton Cotton. Hanson anticipated that Californians weary of "the big city" would find refuge in the region's agreeable climate, stunning beaches, and rich land. He named the city after San Clemente Island, which in turn was named by the explorer Sebastián Vizcaino in 1602 after Saint Clement. Hanson envisioned it as a Mediterranean-style coastal resort town, his "San Clemente by the Sea." He had a clause added to the deeds requiring all building plans to be submitted to an architectural review board in an effort to ensure future development would retain red tile roofs and white exteriors. This proved to be short-lived; an eclectic mix of building styles is found in the oldest parts of town.

Hanson succeeded in promoting the new area and selling property. He built public structures such as the Beach Club, the community center, the pier and San Clemente Plaza, now known as Max Berg Plaza Park. The area was officially incorporated as a city on February 27, 1928, with a council-manager government. Referring to the way he would develop the city, Hanson proclaimed, "I have a clean canvas and I am determined to paint a clean picture. Think of it – a canvas five miles long and one and one-half miles wide!... My San Clemente by the Sea." Soon after San Clemente was incorporated, the need for a fire station was realized. The headlines in San Clemente's first newspaper, El Heraldo de San Clemente June 1928 read: "Building to house local fire department will be constructed by popular subscription and turned over to the city when completed!" Individual subscriptions were received in the amounts from $6.00 to $1,500.00 from the citizenry.

One of the most iconic landmarks in San Clemente is the San Clemente Pier, first constructed in 1928 and rebuilt in 1939 and 1983.

When Ole Hanson came to San Clemente and decided to develop the city he moved into his epitome of the perfect house which was called Casa Romantica. Hansen owned Casa Romantica up until the Great Depression hit and the Bank of America foreclosed on the property. 

In 1969, President Richard Nixon bought part of the H. H. Cotton estate, one of the original homes built by one of Hanson's partners. Nixon called it "La Casa Pacifica" and it was nicknamed the "Western White House," a term for a President's vacation home. It sits above one of the West Coast's premier surfing spots, Trestles, and just north of historic surfing beach San Onofre. Many world leaders visited the home during Nixon's tenure, including Soviet general secretary Leonid Brezhnev, Mexican President Gustavo Díaz Ordaz, Prime Minister of Japan Eisaku Satō, Henry Kissinger, and businessman Bebe Rebozo. After his resignation, Nixon retired to San Clemente to write his memoirs. He sold the home in 1980 and moved to New York City. The property also has historical ties to the Democratic side of the aisle; prior to Nixon's tenure at the estate, H. H. Cotton was known to host Franklin D. Roosevelt, who would visit to play cards in a small outbuilding overlooking the Pacific Ocean.

In 1994, the Clarence Lobo Elementary School, named after Clarence H. Lobo, chief of the Acjachemen people from 1946 to 1985, was opened in San Clemente as part of the Capistrano Unified School District. The opening of the school was notable as the first school in California to be named after an Indigenous leader.

The historic "North Beach" area is home to San Clemente's Casino Building and Ole Hanson Beach Club, which were renovated in 2010 and 2016.

Geography

San Clemente is located at  (33.437828, −117.620397). To the south of town are Camp Pendleton and Trestles surf beach.

Climate

San Clemente has a Mediterranean climate where temperatures tend to average in the 70s °F (20s °C).

Demographics

2020 
The 2020 United States Census reported a population of 64,293. The racial makeup was 81% White, 1.1% African American, 5.1% Asian, and 16.1% Hispanic or Latino of any race.

2010 

The 2010 United States Census reported San Clemente had a population of 63,522. The racial makeup of San Clemente was 54,605 (86.0%) White (76.0% Non-Hispanic White), 411 (0.6%) African American, 363 (0.6%) Native American, 2,333 (3.7%) Asian, 90 (0.1%) Pacific Islander, 3,433 (5.4%) from other races, and 2,287 (3.6%) from two or more races. Hispanic or Latino of any race were 10,702 persons (16.8%).

The Census reported 63,249 people (99.6% of the population) lived in households, 245 (0.4%) lived in non-institutionalized group quarters, and 28 (0.04%) were institutionalized.

There were 23,906 households, out of which 8,210 (34.3%) had children under the age of 18 living in them, 13,873 (58.0%) were marriage living together, 1,898 (7.9%) had a female householder with no husband present, 986 (4.1%) had a male householder with no wife present. There were 1,207 (5.0%) unmarried partnerships, 5,184 households (21.7%) were made up of individuals, and 1,972 (8.2%) had someone living alone who was 65 years of age or older. The average household size was 2.65. There were 16,757 families (70.1% of all households); the average family size was 3.

The population was spread out, with 15,506 people (24.4%) under the age of 18, 5,006 people (7.9%) aged 18 to 24, 16,474 people (25.9%) aged 25 to 44, 18,122 people (28.5%) aged 45 to 64, and 8,414 people (13.2%) who were 65 years of age or older. The median age was 39.7 years. For every 100 females, there were 100.9 males. For every 100 females age 18 and over, there were 98.8 males.

The homeowner vacancy rate was 1.3%; the rental vacancy rate was 5.8%. 41,164 people (64.8% of the population) lived in owner-occupied housing units and 22,085 people (34.8%) lived in rental housing units.

According to the 2010 United States Census, San Clemente had a median household income of $87,184, with 7.9% of the population living below the federal poverty line.

2000

The Federal census statistics from the 2000 census reported San Clemente had a population of 49,936. Population density was 2,833.4 inhabitants per square mile (1,094.2/km). The racial makeup of the city was 87.92% White, 0.77% African American, 0.61% Native American, 2.64% Asian, 0.14% Pacific Islander, 5.11% from other races, and 2.81% from two or more races. Hispanic or Latino of any race were 15.89% of the population.

As of the city's 2010 census, there were 68,763 people and 25,514 housing units in the city. Ninety percent of the adult population is a high school grad or higher, and 5.5% of the population are considered below the poverty line.

 the median household income was $101,843. The per capita income for the city as of 2017 was $54,133. As of March 2010 the median home value was $605,500.

In the city, the population was spread out, with 24.1% under the age of 18, 7.2% from 18 to 24, 31.5% from 25 to 44, 24.1% from 45 to 64, and 13.1% who were 65 years of age or older. The median age was 38 years. For every 100 females, there were 102.4 males. For every 100 females age 18 and over, there were 100.9 males.

Economy

The following companies have their corporate headquarters in San Clemente:

Cameron Health – Medical device manufacturer
ICU Medical – Medical device manufacturer
Pick Up Stix – Fast casual Asian food
Rainbow Sandals – Manufacturer of premium sandals
Stance Socks – Sock and underwear brand

Tourism

San Clemente is a popular tourist destination, owing to its beaches, historic architecture, and attractions. San Clemente Pier is a popular attraction, perpendicular to the San Clemente Beach trail which starts at North Beach and goes as far as Califia, extending 2.6 miles out along the beaches of San Clemente. The San Clemente Beach trail is a popular place for locals to walk or run.

Casa Romantica is one of the most historic places in San Clemente. Casa Romantica is owned by the city and is used as a cultural center. It is also open to rent for private events like weddings. Casa Romantica is located above the San Clemente Pier station and overlooks the San Clemente coastline.

Known as the “Spanish Village by the Sea”, San Clemente has long been known for its Spanish Colonial Revival style architecture. Downtown San Clemente restaurants and shops are adorned with red tile roofs, cream stucco walls, and dark wood doors and windows. The homes in the area range in style, but stick to the Spanish theme for the most part. The area's oldest homes are in Southwest San Clemente, directly south of downtown and "North Beach" area, directly north of downtown. The homes in the Southwest Riviera neighborhood include several new constructions in the Cape Cod style, as well as new modern residences. More traditional, older homes sit in the Lasuen "boot" district; the neighborhood surrounding Lasuens or "Lost Winds" beach is characterized by a variety of styles in both single and double story fashion, with Hansons’s traditional Spanish style sprinkled throughout, crafting an eclectic atmosphere. The renovations to historic buildings in North Beach have sparked a revival in the area, attracting new residents and business owners.

Largest employers

Many people work as civilian employees at the USMC Base Camp Pendelton which is just over the San Diego County line.

According to the city's 2020 Comprehensive Annual Financial Report, the largest employers in the city are:

Sports 

San Clemente is known for its many surfing locations, which include Trestles, Lowers, Middles & Uppers, Cotton's Point, Calafia Beach Park, Riviera, Lasuens (most often called Lost Winds), The Hole, T-Street, The Pier, Linda Lane, 204, North Beach and Poche Beach. It is also home to Surfing Magazine, The Surfer's Journal, and Longboard Magazine.

The city has a large concentration of surfboard shapers and manufacturers. Additionally, numerous world-renowned surfers were raised in San Clemente or took up long-term residence in town, including Kolohe Andino, Shane Beschen, Mike Parsons (originally from Laguna Beach).

San Clemente High School has won 6 out of 7 most recent NSSA national surfing titles.

Education

The city is served by Capistrano Unified School District.

Within the city, there are six elementary schools, three middle schools, and one high school. There is also one virtual public K-12 school: Capistrano Connections Academy with flexible hours for students. The elementary schools are: Truman Benedict, Concordia Elementary, Vista Del Mar, Las Palmas, Marblehead Elementary, and Lobo Elementary. The middle schools are Bernice Ayer, Shorecliffs, and Vista Del Mar.

Las Palmas Elementary is well known for its dual immersion program.

San Clemente High School has an IB (International Baccalaureate) Program and a large number of AP (advanced placement) courses. Students at San Clemente High School have received academic accolades and hosted groups ranging from national title winning dance teams to award-winning orchestras, bands, voice groups and one of the nation's most skilled athletic programs; these groups have also received opportunities to perform at various venues including Carnegie Hall (madrigals and orchestra), various venues in Hawaii (marching band), and many others.

Government and politics

According to the California Secretary of State, as of February 10, 2019, San Clemente has 40,105 registered voters. Of those, 17,791 (44.4%) are registered Republicans, 9,926 (24.8%) are registered Democrats, and 10,309 (25.7%) have declined to state a political party.

San Clemente is a stalwart Republican stronghold in presidential elections with no Democratic nominee winning the city in over four decades. It was one of only five cities in Orange County that backed Donald J. Trump with majorities of its vote in both 2016 and 2020. San Clemente voted in favor of Proposition 8 by 55.5% and for Proposition 4 by 52.2%.

Gene James, elected by to the City Council in 2019, was appointed Mayor in 2021. James introduced a resolution to declare San Clemente a Second Amendment Freedom City in June 2021. In 2022, following the U.S. Supreme Court's decision in Dobbs v. Jackson Women's Health Organization, councilmember Steve Knoblock introduced a resolution to declare San Clemente a "sanctuary for life," which would have outlawed abortion within city limits. Following public pushback, the City Council voted 4-1 to table the measure, with only Knoblock voting to bring the resolution to a vote.

The California DMV has a field office in San Clemente. The location administers permit tests, behind-the-wheel tests, and various types of documentation.

Media

San Clemente was the setting of the MTV reality show Life of Ryan.

It was also the setting of the 2005 film Brick. The town was chosen because it was particularly close to the director Rian Johnson who lived there and went to San Clemente High School, which was the school depicted in the film. Many of the locations in the film are still identical to the real ones, with the exception of the Pin's house, which was flattened a week after exterior shooting; the interior was constructed in a local warehouse. The football field has also since been replaced with artificial turf and track. The phone booths used all through the film are mostly props that were placed on location. The movie One of Her Own is based on incidents in and around San Clemente.

San Clemente is served by The San Clemente Times, which prints once weekly on Thursdays.

Transportation

Interstate 5 runs through San Clemente. The Foothill Transportation Corridor (SR 241) had proposed to connect Mission Viejo to the Orange/San Diego county line, running along the east side of San Clemente and through San Onofre State Beach on its way to I-5. The California Coastal Commission rejected this proposal 8–2. Reasons cited for rejection included: the road's alignment through a state park, endangered species habitat, and a Native American archaeological site, and the runoff from the road damaging the state park and surf break. The Federal Government rejected the proposal to place the toll road in accordance with the TCA proposal. This decision was viewed as a major defeat for the TCA and great victory for The Surfrider Foundation (which is based in San Clemente), and for assorted environmental groups. Although other alternatives have been considered, TCA has no current plans to extend the SR 241 corridor through San Clemente.

Additionally, the city is served by Amtrak's Pacific Surfliner and Metrolink's Orange County Line and Inland Empire-Orange County Line between Los Angeles and San Diego, and which provide beachside service in San Clemente. The city has two stations: San Clemente station and San Clemente Pier station.

In 2016, San Clemente began offering residents free trolley service. The San Clemente Trolley service provides three open-air (windowless) trolleys that cruise throughout the coastal areas of town and pick people up at designated stops every 15 minutes. The trolley is available Memorial Day weekend through Labor Day weekend. The funding for the San Clemente Trolley came from a $1.2 million grant from the Orange County Transportation Authority (OCTA) which the city applied for. The grant will cover most of the costs for the service for seven years. The grant requires the city to fund a portion of the trolley service at $146,000 over the seven-year grant period. The Friends of the San Clemente Beaches, Parks & Recreation Foundation provided a donation of $10,000 towards the funding of the capital costs of the trolley.

In popular culture
San Clemente is mentioned in the Tom Waits song "Diamonds on My Windshield" from the album The Heart of Saturday Night.
San Clemente is mentioned in the 1974 song "Contrabando y traición" by Los Tigres del Norte.
Orange County band The Ziggens released a song named "San Clemente."
The Netflix animated Comedy-Drama Bojack Horseman features a reference to the town in the first episode of its fourth season following a pasta-related accident: "Disaster al dente off the coast of San Clemente!"

Notable people 

Kolby Allard, professional baseball player
Kolohe Andino, professional surfer
Anastasia Ashley, professional surfer
Aaron Bank, US Colonel, Special Forces
Gibson Bardsley, soccer player
Shane Beschen, professional surfer
John "hex" Carter, Nerdapalooza creator
Lon Chaney, Jr., actor
Anthony Cumia, radio host
Sam Darnold, quarterback USC Trojans, New York Jets, Carolina Panthers
Brian de la Puente, NFL football player
Connor De Phillippi, race car driver
Chloe East, American actress
Jennie Eisenhower, granddaughter of President Richard Nixon, great-granddaughter of President Dwight D. Eisenhower
Sue Enquist, Hall of Fame UCLA softball coach
Jim Everett, NFL football quarterback
Fu Manchu, rock band
Jorge Garcia, actor
Ole Hanson, former mayor of Seattle and founder of San Clemente
Annie Hardy, musician with Giant Drag
Billy Johnson, racing driver
Rian Johnson, director
Carl Karcher, founder of Carl's Jr. and CKE Enterprises
Jeff Kargola, professional Freestyle Motocross rider
Todd Keneley, professional wrestling commentator
Karch Kiraly, Olympic gold medalist in volleyball
Gracie Kramer, artistic gymnast, part of the UCLA Bruins women's gymnastics team
Kian Lawley, Youtuber, American actor
Bob Lutz, tennis champion
John Lyon, known as Southside Johnny, lead singer of Southside Johnny and the Asbury Jukes 
Colin McPhillips, professional longboarder
Kyle Murphy, professional football player (offensive tackle, Green Bay Packers)
Richard Nixon, 37th President of the United States and Pat Nixon, first lady
Ryann O'Toole, LPGA golfer
Dominic Purcell, actor
Aaron Rowand, MLB player
Beckah Shae, Christian singer-songwriter
Ryan Sheckler, professional skateboarder
Adrian Smith, architect and designer of the Burj Khalifa, the tallest building in the world
Gloria Swanson, Three time Academy Award Best Actress nominee  
Peter "PT" Townend, surfer
Hal Trumble, American ice hockey administrator and referee.
Jean Vander Pyl, actress, voice of Wilma Flintstone
Paul Walker, American actor
Gene "Pop" Warner, influential football coach
Paul Wiancko, classical cellist

Sister cities
San Clemente is twinned with:
  San Clemente del Tuyú, Buenos Aires, Argentina.
  North End, San Andres, Colombia.

See also
List of beaches in California

References

External links

The San Clemente Sun Post News, the town's oldest newspaper
San Clemente Times community newspaper

 
1928 establishments in California
Cities in Orange County, California
Incorporated cities and towns in California
Populated coastal places in California
Populated places established in 1925
Populated places established in 1928